The socialist fraternal kiss was a special form of greeting between socialist leaders. The act demonstrated the special connection that exists between socialist countries, consisting of an embrace, along with a series of three kisses on alternate cheeks. In rare cases, when the two leaders considered themselves exceptionally close, the kisses were given on the mouth rather than on the cheeks.

The socialist fraternal embrace consists of a series of three deep hugs, alternating between the left and right sides of the body, without kissing. This modified greeting was adopted by Communist leaders in Asia, which lacks a tradition of cheek kissing as greeting. During the Cold War, Communist leaders in Asia consented to receive kisses from Europeans and Cubans, but they themselves omitted the kiss.

History
This ritual originated in the European practice of cheek kissing as a greeting between family members or close friends. It has also been associated with the Eastern Orthodox fraternal kiss.

With the expansion of Communism after World War II, the Soviet Union was no longer isolated as the only Communist country.  The fraternal socialist kiss became a ritualised greeting among the leaders of Communist countries.  The greeting was also adopted by socialist leaders in the Third World, as well as the leaders of socialist-aligned liberation movements such as the Palestinian Liberation Organization and the African National Congress.

Kremlinology
Kremlinologists paid attention to whether the fraternal embrace was exchanged between Communist leaders. The omission of the customary embrace indicated a lower level of relations between the two countries.

After the Sino-Soviet split, the Chinese refused to embrace their Soviet counterparts or to address them as "comrade". When Soviet premier Nikita Khrushchev tried to embrace Chinese Communist Party chairman Mao Zedong on a visit to Beijing in 1959, Mao stepped back to avoid the embrace and offered a handshake instead. Even with the normalization of relations in 1989, the Chinese continued to omit the fraternal embrace when greeting Soviet leaders. This was done to emphasize that Sino-Soviet relations were not returning to the pre-split level of the 1950s; Chinese protocol specifically insisted on "handshake, no embrace."

Cheek kissing
The socialist fraternal kiss should not be confused with ordinary cheek kissing between world leaders. For example, it is traditional for the President of France to greet world leaders by kissing them on both cheeks.

References

External links
 

Eastern Bloc
kissing
socialism